Fritz Deike (24 June 1913 – 21 October 1973) was a German international footballer.

References

1913 births
1973 deaths
Association football midfielders
German footballers
Germany international footballers
Hannover 96 players